Rhipidomys is a genus of rodents in the family Cricetidae, The following 24 species of climbing mouse species are currently recognised:

 Rhipidomys albujai
 Southern climbing mouse (Rhipidomys austrinus)
 Cariri climbing mouse (Rhipidomys cariri)
 Cauca climbing mouse (Rhipidomys caucensis)
 Coues's climbing mouse (Rhipidomys couesi)
 Eastern Amazon climbing mouse (Rhipidomys emiliae)
 Buff-bellied climbing mouse (Rhipidomys fulviventer)
 Gardner's climbing mouse (Rhipidomys gardneri)
Rhipidomys ipukensis
Rhipidomys itoan
 Broad-footed climbing mouse (Rhipidomys latimanus)
 White-footed climbing mouse (Rhipidomys leucodactylus)
 MacConnell's climbing mouse (Rhipidomys macconnelli)
 Cerrado climbing mouse (Rhipidomys macrurus)
 Atlantic Forest climbing mouse (Rhipidomys mastacalis)
 Peruvian climbing mouse (Rhipidomys modicus)
 Splendid climbing mouse (Rhipidomys nitela)
 Yellow-bellied climbing mouse (Rhipidomys ochrogaster)
Rhipidomys similis
Rhipidomys tenuicauda
Rhipidomys tribei
 Venezuelan climbing mouse (Rhipidomys venezuelae)
 Charming climbing mouse (Rhipidomys venustus)
 Wetzel's climbing mouse (Rhipidomys wetzeli)

References

 
Rodent genera